The Islamic Azad University, Sanandaj Branch (Persian: دانشگاه آزاد اسلامی واحد سنندج) is a private university located in Kurdistan Province, Iran. Mostly known as Azad University of Sanandaj, the university was founded in 1983 as part of a chain of universities called the Islamic Azad Universities. The university has over 289 faculty and academic staff and an enrollment of 13,000 students. The Azad University of Sanandaj is one of the largest private universities in the western region of Iran and has more than 120 courses.

Campuses 
Faculty of Science; Faculty of Humanities; Faculty of Nursing; Faculty of Agriculture; Faculty of Veterinary Science; Faculty of Engineering & Technical; Faculty of Psychology; Faculty of Architecture & Art; Faculty of Literature & Foreign Language.

Sanandaj
Education in Kurdistan Province
Buildings and structures in Kurdistan Province